Brendan O'Neill may refer to:

Brendan O'Neill (businessman) (born 1948), British business executive
Brendan O'Neill (columnist), British columnist
Brendan O'Neill (musician) (born 1951, Belfast), Irish musician, drummer of the late Rory Gallagher band and now Nine Below Zero